Brahe Rock is the rock off the north coast of Livingston Island in the South Shetland Islands, Antarctica 85 m long in west–east direction and 50 m wide, and split in three. Its surface area is 0.14 ha. The vicinity was visited by early 19th century sealers.

The feature is named after Tycho Brahe (1546-1601), a Danish astronomer who applied the triangulation method to map Hven (Ven) Island; in association with other names in the area deriving from the early development or use of geodetic instruments and methods.

Location
Bulgarian mapping in 2009 and 2017.

See also
 List of Antarctic and subantarctic islands

Maps
 Livingston Island to King George Island. Scale 1:200000.  Admiralty Nautical Chart 1776.  Taunton: UK Hydrographic Office, 1968
 South Shetland Islands. Scale 1:200000 topographic map No. 3373. DOS 610 - W 62 58. Tolworth, UK, 1968
 L. Ivanov. Antarctica: Livingston Island and Greenwich, Robert, Snow and Smith Islands. Scale 1:120000 topographic map. Troyan: Manfred Wörner Foundation, 2010.  (First edition 2009. )
 L. Ivanov. Antarctica: Livingston Island and Smith Island. Scale 1:100000 topographic map. Manfred Wörner Foundation, 2017. 
 Antarctic Digital Database (ADD). Scale 1:250000 topographic map of Antarctica. Scientific Committee on Antarctic Research (SCAR). Since 1993, regularly upgraded and updated

Notes

References
 Bulgarian Antarctic Gazetteer. Antarctic Place-names Commission. (details in Bulgarian, basic data in English)

External links
 Brahe Rock. Adjusted Copernix satellite image

Rock formations of Livingston Island
Bulgaria and the Antarctic